Gajapati is a regnal title from the region of modern Odisha in the Indian subcontinent. The word ‘Gajapati’ in Odia refers to "Gaja" meaning elephant and "Pati" meaning master or husband. Thus Gajapati etymologically means a king with an army of elephants. The institution of Gajapati kingship as a title was used by the Eastern Ganga dynasty and was used by succeeding dynasties, with the patronisation of Lord Jagannatha as the imperial deity of the Odia cultural realm.

The current titular Gajapati belongs to the head of the Bhoi dynasty, as the dynasty inherited the legacy of the historical ruling chiefs of Odisha invested in the title of Gajapati. They also exercised administrative control of the Jagannath Temple at Puri.

History
The ruling chiefs of Kalinga, Utkal, Dakshina Kosala used various regnal titles upon coronation or conquest of regions, chiefly being the titles of Kalingadhipati and Tri-Kalingadhipati. Anantavarman Vajrahasta V assumed the titles as Trikalingadhipati (lord of the three Kalingas) and Sakalakalingadhipati (lord of complete Kalinga) challenging the authority of the Somavanshis and eventually laying the foundations for the Eastern Gangas as the unification of the Odia kingdoms eventually culminated under Anantavarman Chodaganga.

Narasingha Deva I was the first king from the Eastern Ganga dynasty to use the title of Gajapati among the Odishan kings in the 1246 CE inscription at the Kapilash Temple.

Modern ceremonial titles
The ceremonial regnal title of the Gajapati Maharaja is as follows:

Shree Shree Shree Veerashree Gajapati Goudeswar Nabakotikarnatatkala Kalabaragesvara Viradhiviravar Bhuta Vairaba Sadhu Sasnotirna Routraja Atula Balaparakrama Sahasra Bahu Kshetriyakula Dhumaketu Maharaja Adhiraja (regnal name)

Customary title of Gajapati upon accession
The cyclical order the names of the Gajapati Maharaja:
Ramchandra Deva
Birakeshari Deva
Divyasingha Deva
Mukunda Deva

Customary title of the queens of Gajapati upon accession
Chandramani Patamahadei
Suryamani Patamahadei
Leelavati Patamahadei
Padmabati Patamahadei

List of Gajapatis of the ruling dynasties

References

Titles in India
Titles of national or ethnic leadership
Royal titles
Men's social titles
Dynasties of Odisha
History of Odisha
Indian nobility